Live @ The Key Club is a live album by California punk rock band Pennywise, released in 2000. It was recorded at The Key Club, on May 11, 2000.

Track listing

References

External links

Live @ the Key Club at YouTube (streamed copy where licensed)

Pennywise (band) albums
2000 live albums
Epitaph Records live albums